Sheikh Haikel Sheikh Salim Bajrai (born 10 October 1975) is a Singaporean rapper, actor and radio personality. He won the talent competition Asia Bagus in 1991. As a multi media personality with numerous stints in radio, television, film, and stage, he has produced three studio albums and numerous single track albums to date. He now runs a music school in Kuala Lumpur where they teach varied genres of music including, Hip Hop, Classical and Rock.

Early life and education
He attended Saint Patrick's School and has a BA in Performing Arts and Psychology from the Queensland University of Technology.

Career

Acting
Sheikh Haikel first appeared on the big screen in the iconic Singaporean film, Army Daze. Army Daze made a return to the theatre in 2006 under the direction of Beatrice Chia and Goh Boon Teck, with Sheikh retaining the role of Johari Salleh. His next performance was as Jeff in the joint Singaporean-Malaysian film City Sharks in 2003 which he starred in alongside Nicholas Lee and Hans Isaac.

He has starred in many sitcoms in TV such as 3 Rooms and The Donnie Lee Show. He also guest starred various times on the critically successful Singaporean sitcom, Under One Roof. He has also hosted ESPN's Football Crazy and is currently the host of Okto's Knockout.

Radio
In 2004, complaints were made to Singapore's Media Development Authority that he and his then co-host Daniel Ong made lewd remarks on air when a teenage male listener called in for advice on how to attract a girl he liked. As a result of these complaints, Ong was suspended from on-air duties while Sheikh was asked to leave. MediaCorp Radio's 987FM was cautioned and fined S$30,000.

Sheikh Haikel was a DJ for the local broadcast channel 98.7FM, and on the Breakfast Show on channel 91.3FM in 2008.

Music
Sheikh's music is rooted in rap. He became interested in it at the age of nine, when his mother bought a Run DMC tape for him by accident, having mistaken it for a The Pips tape.

Sheikh won the Asia Bagus Grand Championship as part of the rap duo Construction Sight in 1991. Construction Sight is credited as "Singapore's first ever rap group". His first two solo albums For Sure and For Sure Too led him to win Best Local English Song at the Compass Awards in 2002 and 2004 for the hit single, Witulah. His third album 10.10.10 was released on the same date of his 35th birthday, 10 October 2010. He performed a series of songs at the President's Star Charity 2012.

Business 
In February 2017, seven years after convincing the founders of Fatboys The Burger Bar - together with his wife Anna Belle Francis, friends, inclusive Singaporean deejay duo ‘The Muttons  - launched FatPapas Burgers and Shakes; which is marketed as a halal subsidiary of the aforementioned Fatboys.

Personal life
Sheikh Haikel is a Singaporean of Arab & Yemeni descent. He has one sister. He is married to Singaporean actress Anna Belle Francis. They have three children – Triqka (born 2003), Abbra (born 2004) and their most recent, Sheikh Juz (born 2014)

In November 2010, Sheikh started a feud with Korean boy band U-KISS as they allegedly bullied him backstage at a concert in Bedok Reservoir. After the event, Sheikh posted on Twitter, "U- Kiss my ass!!!". Although he did not elaborate on what ignited the feud, he also tweeted: "All u-kiss fans were to [sic] busy to notice anything else. I was to [sic] busy trying to get u-kiss on stage." After another few tweets targeted towards U-KISS and their fans, Sheikh apologised for his banter on Twitter.

Discography

Solo albums
 For Sure (2002)
 For Sure Too (2003)
 10.10.10 (2010)
 Eh Lah (2011; one track album promoting his upcoming album, Check, Check, 1–2, 1–2)
 Check, Check, 1–2, 1–2 (TBA)

Singles
 "Witulah" (With u lah) (Peaked at No. 1 on Malaysian music charts)

Filmography

References

External links
 
 

Living people
Singaporean people of Arab descent
Singaporean people of Malay descent
20th-century Singaporean male singers
1975 births
Queensland University of Technology alumni
Singaporean rappers
Singaporean Muslims
21st-century Singaporean male singers